Tachylalia or tachylogia is extremely rapid speech. Tachylalia by itself is not considered a speech disorder. Tachylalia occurs in many clutterers and many people who have speech disorders.

Tachylalia is a generic term for speaking fast, and does not need to coincide with other speech problems.

Tachylalia may be exhibited as a single stream of rapid speech without prosody, and can be delivered quietly or mumbled.  Tachylalia can be simulated by stimulating the brain electronically.

Tachylalia can occur with Parkinson's disease.

References

Speech disorders